Town Center Corte Madera is an upscale shopping center located in Corte Madera, California. It is located off U.S. Route 101 on Tamalpais Drive. It is anchored by a Safeway supermarket and Barnes & Noble. It is located across the freeway from The Village at Corte Madera and the two shopping centers provide much of the city of Corte Madera's income from retail sales tax. The Town Center is owned by 770 Tamalpais Drive, Inc. The owner of that corporation is Colliers.

History

The Town Center is a successor to the Corte Madera Center (CMC), which opened in 1958 next to Littleman's Supermarket (later Cala Foods) which opened in 1952 and closed in 1985 and was located where P.F. Chang's is. Louis Thomas, a men's apparel and formalwear shop, opened in 1958 and is the oldest surviving tenant. In 1985 CMC was largely redeveloped, significantly remodeled, and renamed the Town Center Corte Madera. Anchor tenant Montgomery Ward had closed. J.C. Penney added a second story, and then closed in 2000. There was a The Good Guys!, but it was bought out by CompUSA, and the location was closed. It now houses a P. F. Chang's China Bistro.

There was substantial local controversy in 2005 and 2006 when it was announced that a Barnes & Noble chain book store would be moving into the space vacated by Marshall's, as the Book Passage was nearby, one of Marin County's largest independent book stores, that opened in 1976. Though many Barnes & Noble stores have closed, it remains open at the Town Center. Book Passage also remains open in Corte Madera.

Anchors and major tenants 
As of 2007, the Town Center Corte Madera and Madison Marquette Realty Services identified the largest tenants:

Stores 
Safeway
Barnes & Noble
The Container Store
Rite Aid
REI
Louis Thomas

Restaurants 
Il Fornaio

References

Shopping malls in Marin County, California
Corte Madera, California
Shopping malls established in 1958